William F. Hulse (December 12, 1920 - March 13, 1995) was an American middle-distance runner. In 1943 he set a national record in the mile, won the national cross country and 800 m titles, and placed second in the 1500 m. Next year he won the national 1500 m title and placed third in the 800 m.

Hulse was a chemist by profession, and in his early years worked on the polymerization of synthetic rubber.

Hulse died on March 13, 1995, at the age of 74.

References

American male middle-distance runners
1920 births
1995 deaths
20th-century American people